Stănculescu is a Romanian surname that may refer to:

Alina Stănculescu (born 1990), Romanian artistic gymnast
Ioana Stanciulescu (born 2004), Romanian artistic gymnast
Victor Stănculescu (1928–2016), Romanian general officer and politician
 Ştefan Stănculescu (1923–2013), Romanian football player and coach

See also
 Stanca (disambiguation)

Romanian-language surnames